Borsonia armata is a species of sea snail, a marine gastropod mollusk in the family Borsoniidae.

Description

Distribution
This marine species occurs off the Philippines.

References

armata
Gastropods described in 1895